Andriy Kutsenko (born ) is a Ukrainian track cyclist who competed in the team sprint event at the 2013 UCI Track Cycling World Championships.

References

External links
 Profile at cyclingarchives.com

1989 births
Living people
Ukrainian track cyclists
Ukrainian male cyclists
Place of birth missing (living people)